Villedieu is the name or part of the name of several communes in France:

 Villedieu, Cantal, in the Cantal département
 Villedieu, Côte-d'Or, in the  Côte-d'Or département
 Villedieu, Vaucluse, in the Vaucluse département
 Villedieu-la-Blouère, in the Maine-et-Loire département
 Villedieu-le-Château, in the Loir-et-Cher département
 Villedieu-lès-Bailleul, in the Orne département
 Villedieu-les-Poêles, in the Manche département, best known for producing copper cookware
 Villedieu-sur-Indre, in the Indre département
 Les Villedieu, in the Doubs département

Villedieu may also refer to:
 Marie-Catherine de Villedieu, a 17th-century French author.

See also
La Villedieu (disambiguation)